David Parkes (born 7 April 1950 in Dublin) is an Irish former soccer player who was active during the 1960s and 1970s. After retiring he became a singer .

Parkes made his League of Ireland debut for St Patrick's Athletic in 1967 and signed for Bohemians in 1969. He played his part in Bohs FAI Cup winning campaign of 1970 where he formed a solid full-back partnership with John Doran. He spent 4 seasons at Dalymount Park making 76 appearances in the league and 3 appearances in European competition.

He signed for Shamrock Rovers in January 1973 where he stayed for two and a half years. He later played for Waterford and Drogheda United.

His son Gary played for Rovers Under 16s in the 90s.

Football Honours
FAI Cup: 1
 Bohemians - 1970

Sources 
 The Hoops by Paul Doolan and Robert Goggins

Republic of Ireland association footballers
League of Ireland players
St Patrick's Athletic F.C. players
Bohemian F.C. players
Shamrock Rovers F.C. players
Waterford F.C. players
Drogheda United F.C. players
Living people
1950 births
League of Ireland XI players
Association football fullbacks
Irish male singers